The 1926 Idaho Vandals football team represented the University of Idaho in the 1926 college football season. The Vandals were led by first-year head coach Charles F. Erb and were in their fifth season in the Pacific Coast Conference (PCC).  Home games were played on campus in Moscow at MacLean Field. Idaho compiled a 3–4–1 overall record and went 1–4 in conference games.

In the Battle of the Palouse with neighbor Washington State, the Vandals' three-game winning streak in the series ended with a  homecoming loss in the mud on 

Following the departure of Matty Mathews in April for St. Louis, Erb was hired as the Vandals' head coach in May. Earlier in the decade, he was an all-PCC quarterback at the University of California, leading the Wonder Teams of hall of fame head coach Andy Smith. The 23-year-old Erb was previously the head coach at the University of Nevada in Reno.

Schedule

References

External links
 Gem of the Mountains: 1927 University of Idaho yearbook – 1926 football season 
 Go Mighty Vandals – 1926 football season
 Scout.com: Idaho – Idaho vs. USC – The 1920s Series (Part III) and Part IV
 Idaho Argonaut – student newspaper – 1926 editions

Idaho
Idaho Vandals football seasons
Idaho Vandals football